Patrik Parkkonen (born 23 January 1993) is a Finnish professional ice hockey defenceman. He is currently a free agent.

Playing career
Coming through the youth system of HIFK, he spent two years in Canada, playing for the Medicine Hat Tigers of the WHL (2010-2012), before returning to his native Finland. Parkkonen made his SM-liiga debut playing with Ässät during the 2012–13 SM-liiga season. Following a three-year stint at Ässät, Parkkonen signed with Lausitzer Füchse of Germany’s second division DEL2. In December 2015, his original short-term contract was extended until the end of the 2015–16 season.

After three European seasons away from Finland, Parkkonen opted to return to North America as a professional, agreeing to a contract with the Wichita Thunder of the ECHL on 25 September 2019.

References

External links

1993 births
Living people
Ässät players
BIK Karlskoga players
Finnish ice hockey defencemen
Lausitzer Füchse players
Lempäälän Kisa players
Medicine Hat Tigers players
IK Oskarshamn players
Orli Znojmo players
TuTo players
Wichita Thunder players
People from Porvoo
Sportspeople from Uusimaa
HC Karlovy Vary players
HK Nitra players
Finnish expatriate ice hockey players in the Czech Republic
Finnish expatriate ice hockey players in the United States
Finnish expatriate ice hockey players in Slovakia
Finnish expatriate ice hockey players in Canada
Finnish expatriate ice hockey players in Sweden
Finnish expatriate ice hockey players in Germany